General elections were held in Palau on 4 November 2008 to elect the President and members of the National Congress. The presidential election was won by Johnson Toribiong. Incumbent President Tommy Remengesau was ineligible to run because he had served the maximum two consecutive terms allowed and announced that he would run for a seat in the Senate.

This was the first election in Palau in which presidential candidates ran with a declared vice-presidential candidates. In previous elections, the President and Vice-Presidents had been elected separately, and the winners of those elections served as a "national leadership team".

Presidential candidates
Primary elections were held on 23 September, with two candidates progressing to the general election in November. Four candidates registered for the primary elections:
Elias Camsek Chin – The incumbent Vice-President was seeking a promotion to the Palauan presidency.  His running mate was Senator Alan R. Seid.
Johnson Toribiong – He is the current Ambassador to the Republic of China (Taiwan), and he was running with Delegate Kerai Mariur.
Surangel S. Whipps – He is the President of the Senate and his running mate was Billy Kuartei, the Chief of Staff for President Remengesau.
Joshua Koshiba – He is a Senator and his running mate was Governor of Peleliu Jackson Ngiraingas.

Campaign
All four presidential candidates and their running mates held rallies throughout Palau.  Campaigning also took place in overseas Palauan communities in the mainland United States, Hawaii, Guam and the Northern Mariana Islands.

A total of 43 candidates ran for the thirteen seats in the Senate, while 44 candidates contested the sixteen seats in the House of Delegates. A record ten women were competing for seats in the Senate and House of Delegates, with seven women running for the at large Senate race.

Results

President
Elias Chin and Johnson Toribiong were the top two vote-getters in the primary elections. Chin and Toribiong then faced each other in the general election. In early, preliminary results Toribiong held a 130-vote lead over Chin, with 1,629 votes to Chin's 1,499. Toribiong and his running mate, Kerai Mariur, were declared the winner of the election on 7 November. It was reported that Toribiong had received a concession phone call from Vice-President Chin.

Senate
Surangel Whipps, Jr. has made history by becoming the first Senator to win by write-in and he also led all Senators with highest percentage (65.2%) of votes since his father achieved 73.5%.

Elected members
Surangel Whipps Jr. (6,461)
Raynold "Arnold" Oilouch (6,073)
Mlib Tmetuchel (5,360)
Joel Toribiong (5,086)
Katharine Kesolei (4,947)
Mark U. Rudimch (4,891)
Hokkons Baules (4,437)
Adalbert Eledui (3,934)
Regina Mesebeluu(3,731)
Alfonso N. Diaz (3,603)
Tommy E. Remengesau Jr. (3,579)
Regis Akitaya (3,144)
Paul Ueki (3,044)

House of Delegates

Elected members

References

External links
Pacific Magazine: Record Number Of Women Seek Palau Senate Seats
Okedyulabeluu: Updated results below
Pacific Magazine: Johnson Toribiong Wins Palau Presidential Race

Palau
2008 in Palau
Election and referendum articles with incomplete results
Elections in Palau
Non-partisan elections
Palau National Congress
Presidential elections in Palau